Hutchings Career Center, also known as W.S. Hutchings College and Career Academy, is a high school in Macon, Georgia, United States. It was established in 2002. The school's teams are known as the Cougars.

References

External links
 

Schools in Macon, Georgia
High schools in Georgia (U.S. state)